Protoclupea is an extinct genus of ray-finned fish that lived from the Oxfordian to the early Tithonian stage of the Late Jurassic epoch. It contains one species, Protoclupea chilensis, fossils of which have been found in the Domeyko Range of Antofagasta Region, northern Chile. The genus has been placed in the family Varasichthyidae together with the genera Bobbichthys, Domeykos, Luisichthys and Varasichthys.

References 

Crossognathiformes
Late Jurassic fish
Oxfordian genera
Tithonian genera
Jurassic fish of South America
Jurassic Chile
Fossils of Chile
Fossil taxa described in 1975